The Rebel Unity Centre was a communist grouping in Nepal, formed after Rishi Devkota (Azad) split away from the Communist Party of Nepal (Fourth Convention) in 1980. In November 1981, the group merged into the Communist Party of Nepal (Marxist-Leninist).

References

Defunct communist parties in Nepal